Matt Cole (born November 7, 1996) is an American football wide receiver. He played college football for the McKendree Bearcats.

College career
After graduating from Chicago's Curie Metropolitan High School, Cole played for the McKendree Bearcats as a wide receiver and return specialist. As a senior, he was named the Great Lakes Valley Conference (GVLC) Special Teams Player of the Year and first-team All-GVLC after catching 43 passes for 939 yards and 12 touchdowns while also returning 23 kickoffs for 625 yards and one touchdown and eight punts for 208 yards and one touchdown.

Professional career

Miami Dolphins
Cole was signed as an undrafted free agent by the Miami Dolphins on April 29, 2020. He was waived on September 5, 2020, during final roster cuts, and signed to the team's practice squad the next day. He was placed on the practice squad/COVID-19 list by the team on November 12, 2020, and restored to the practice squad on November 26.

San Francisco 49ers
Cole was signed to a two-year contract off of the Dolphins' practice squad by the San Francisco 49ers on December 24, 2020. Cole made his NFL debut in the 49ers' final game of the season, making two tackles on special teams in a 23–26 loss to the Seattle Seahawks. Cole was waived on May 4, 2021.

New York Jets
On May 5, 2021, Cole was claimed off waivers by the New York Jets. He was waived on August 6, 2021.

New York Giants
On August 8, 2021, Cole was claimed off waivers by the New York Giants. He was waived on August 31, 2021 and re-signed to the practice squad the next day. On September 28, 2021, he was released from the practice squad.

Carolina Panthers
On October 4, 2021, Cole was signed to the Carolina Panthers practice squad. He was released on December 7.

Seattle Seahawks
On December 14, 2021, Cole was signed to the Seattle Seahawks practice squad. He signed a reserve/future contract with the Seahawks on January 10, 2022. He was waived on May 13, 2022.

Washington Commanders
On August 8, 2022, Cole signed with the Washington Commanders. He was released on August 30.

References

External links
McKendree Bearcats bio

1996 births
Living people
African-American players of American football
21st-century African-American sportspeople
Players of American football from Chicago
American football wide receivers
Carolina Panthers players
McKendree Bearcats football players
New York Giants players
New York Jets players
San Francisco 49ers players
Seattle Seahawks players
Washington Commanders players